North Antrim may refer to:

The northern part of County Antrim
North Antrim (Assembly constituency)
North Antrim (Northern Ireland Parliament constituency)
North Antrim (UK Parliament constituency)